is a film directed by Sabu. It was shown at the Busan International Film Festival on October 5, 2013. Running time, 85 minutes. Produced by Yoshiki Kumazawa, Satake Kazumi. It is about a future Japan where zombies are domesticated as servants and pets - the film chronicles a female zombie's 'ordeals and retaliation'.

It won the Grand Prize at the Festival international du film fantastique de Gérardmer in February 2014.

Synopsis
In a future Japan, zombies are captured and sold to wealthy families to serve as butler-slaves through an organization that deals with this. Scientists have finally figured out how to eliminate their hunger and their ferocity: no longer giving them meat and only fruit and vegetables. The undead also have levels and the lower the level the more human they are. A young zombie woman (Miss Zombie) is given to a wealthy family formed by Dr. Teramoto, his wife Shizuko and his son Kenechi. The non-human seems not to have lost her mind due to her low virus level and she still remembers the moment she lost her child when she was still in her womb. The woman becomes the pet of the family, doing whatever they order. In the evening, after receiving her "dinner", she walks through the streets of the city, teased by everyone, in order to return to her small house to eat her food, including, she also finds a white flower given to her by Shizuko.

The days pass, and Miss Zombie keeps all the flowers that are given to her by the woman of the house as she also keeps the weapons with which she is attacked by the citizens of the city. When she is raped by some shady guys who work near Teramoto's house, Teramoto sees everything and is shocked. Kenechi dies in an accident on a lake and Shizuko, in order not to lose his son, has the zombie bite him to turn him into an undead. The child awakens, but instead of embracing his birth mother, he holds the undead in her arms, recognizing her as her only parent. For this reason, the woman of the house begins to hate the zombie, and her hatred increases when she learns that Teramoto has also fallen madly in love with her. Moreover, Miss Zombie seems to have found her agility again and for this she takes revenge on all those who had abused her up to that moment and with their blood she prepares the bottles to feed Kenechi.

Shizuko, tired of Miss Zombie, decides to kill her by shooting her with the gun, but she accidentally hits the Teramoto, killing him. The undead, hearing the shot, runs away and takes Kenechi with her. The woman pursues them, killing anyone who comes within range, including the rapists of the undead. Shizuko manages to reach the two, but she sees the way in which Kenechi has become attached to Miss Zombie and before her, starts a desperate cry and then commits suicide for the abandonment of her son. Kenechi, seeing her mother's suicide comes back, and the undead decides to turn her into a zombie too. Mother and son can finally hug, while Miss Zombie puts a gun to her head and commits suicide, tired of the oppression of that world.

Cast
 Toru Tezuka  -Dr. Teramoto
 Ayaka Komatsu -Shara
 Makoto Togashi -Teramoto’s wife, Shizuko
 Riku Onishi -Teramoto’s young son, Kenichi
 also - Taro Suruga, Tateto Serizawa, Takaya Yamauchi.

Critical reception
The film was reviewed favourably at variety.com : - "the low-budget film suggests a cross between Lucky McKee’s “The Woman” and Jonathan Levine’s “Warm Bodies,”  Miss Zombie’s exploitation by her “owners” even recalls recent realist dramas about foreign domestic helpers (some scenarios are almost identical to those in Cannes Camera d’Or winner “Ilo Ilo”. "Komatsu (Shara) interprets the character’s transformation — from a stiff, marionette-like figure to someone driven by love and altruism — with a sullen intensity made even more effective by her lack of dialogue. Komatsu made her name as a “gravure idol” (a particular type of pin-up girl in Japan),  "and some of her scenes with Teramoto cheekily channel certain genres of Japanese erotica."

References

External links
 
 

2013 films
2010s Japanese-language films
Japanese post-apocalyptic films
Films directed by Sabu
Japanese zombie films